Cooper Pillot is an American actor best known for portraying himself in The Naked Brothers Band television series and The Naked Brothers Band: The Movie.

Personal life
Pillot attended Tulane University, where he studied economics.

References

21st-century American male actors
American male television actors
American male film actors
Year of birth missing (living people)
Place of birth missing (living people)
Living people
Tulane University alumni